John Francis Xavier Davoren (July 27, 1915 – August 24, 1997) was a U.S. politician who served as a member of the Massachusetts House of Representatives from 1955 to 1967 and Massachusetts Secretary of the Commonwealth from 1967 to 1974. While in the house, he served as the House Majority Leader from 1962 to 1964 and Speaker from 1964 to 1967. Davoren left the House of Representatives in 1967 after he was elected Secretary of the Commonwealth.

See also
 1955–1956 Massachusetts legislature
 1965–1966 Massachusetts legislature

References

1915 births
1997 deaths
College of the Holy Cross alumni
Speakers of the Massachusetts House of Representatives
Democratic Party members of the Massachusetts House of Representatives
Secretaries of the Commonwealth of Massachusetts
People from Milford, Massachusetts
People from Dennis, Massachusetts
20th-century American politicians